Cecilia Domeniguini Coccolo (born 22 September 1991) is a Uruguayan footballer who plays as a midfielder for Peñarol Colonia. She has been a member of the Uruguay women's national team.

Club career
Domeniguini played in Uruguay for Colón.

International career
Domeniguini played for Uruguay at senior level in the 2014 Copa América Femenina.

Personal life
Domeniguini lives in Colonia del Sacramento.

References 

1991 births
Living people
Women's association football midfielders
Uruguayan women's footballers
People from Colonia del Sacramento
Uruguayan sportspeople of Italian descent
Uruguay women's international footballers
Colón F.C. players